HC Generals Kyiv is a Ukrainian ice hockey club from Kyiv. The team participates in the Ukrainian Hockey League.

History
The club was founded in 2011 and folded in 2017. They were playing in the Ukrainian championship the 2013–14 season, finishing on the fifth place and missing the playoffs.

In the 2014–15 season, the team finished on the second place during the regular season. In the playoffs, they were losing in two straight games in the semi-final towards ATEK Kyiv.

In the 2015–16 season, the team finished on the second place during the regular season. In the playoffs, they were winning in the semi-final over HK Kremenchuk (3-2 in games). In the final, they were beaten by HC Donbass in four straight games.

Notes

External links
 HK Generals Kyiv Eurohockey

Ice hockey teams in Ukraine
Sport in Kyiv
Ice hockey clubs established in 2011
2011 establishments in Ukraine
Ice hockey clubs disestablished in 2017
2017 disestablishments in Ukraine